Nieuwkoop is a town and municipality in the western Netherlands, in the province of South Holland. The municipality was enlarged on 1 January 2007, through the amalgamation of Liemeer and Ter Aar.

On May 3rd, 2008, the Dutch newspaper Algemeen Dagblad published an article which stated that Nieuwkoop is the safest municipality of the Netherlands. 

The municipality of Nieuwkoop includes the following communities:

History
The oldest part of Nieuwkoop are the buildings along the Nieuwkoopse Plassen (Nieuwkoop's Ponds), many of which are completely surrounded by water and accessible over individual bridges to the main road. The Nieuwkoopse Plassen are shallow lakes that were dug for peat harvesting in the 16th century and are now designated as a natural monument. New neighborhoods north-west of the main road are built after World War II.

Notable people 
 John of Leiden (1509 in Zevenhoven – 1536) a Dutch leader of the Anabaptism movement in Münster
 Catharina Oostfries (1636 in Nieuwkoop – 1708) a Dutch Golden Age glass painter
 Willem van Eijk (1941 in Korteraar – 2019) a twice convicted Dutch serial killer
 Daan Roosegaarde (born 1979 in Nieuwkoop) a Dutch artist who merges technology and art

Sport 
 Wil Burgmeijer (born 1947 in Ter Aar) a retired Dutch speed skater, competed at the 1968 Winter Olympics
 Jos Valentijn (born 1952 in Ter Aar) a retired speed skater
 Petra de Bruin (born 1962 in Nieuwkoop) a Dutch former cyclist
 Ralph Schwarz (1967 in Nieuwkoop – 1992) a Dutch rower, competed in the 1988 Summer Olympics
 Arjan van der Laan (born 1969 in Nieuwkoop) a Dutch former footballer with 427 club caps, now manages the Netherlands women's national football team
 Sander Berk (born 1979 in Nieuwveen) a Dutch triathlete
 Laurien van der Graaff (born 1987 in Nieuwkoop) a Swiss cross-country skier, competed at the 2014 Winter Olympics for Switzerland
 Melissa Wijfje (born 1995 in Ter Aar) a Dutch allround speed skater

Gallery

References

External links
 Official website
 Nieuwkoop Rus

 
Municipalities of South Holland
Populated places in South Holland